The National Peanut Festival (NPF), the United States' largest peanut festival, is held each fall in Dothan, Alabama, to honor peanut growers and to celebrate the harvest season.

Established in 1938, the fairgrounds are located on Highway 231 South, three miles south of the Ross Clark Circle. The festivities include games and amusement rides on a large midway, animal acts, agricultural displays, an outdoor amphitheater with live music concerts by national recording artists, beauty pageants, arts and crafts displays, contests, food and a two-hour parade. The National Peanut festival also sponsors and holds field crop exhibits with prizes awarded to each exhibitor.

The peanut festival also has other competitions, including sewing, cake decorating, photography, who has grown the biggest peanut, cooking, and art. Every year, crowds of people enjoy the festival.

There was no festival between 1942 & 1946. In 2020 due to the COVID-19 pandemic there was also no festival, instead the carnival who hosted the festival went to the local mall and had some acts and performances.

External links 
 Official site

References

2. “National Peanut Festival Canceled for 2020”  WTVY News Channel. 

Autumn festivals
Festivals in Alabama
Food and drink festivals in the United States
Recurring events established in 1938
Tourist attractions in Houston County, Alabama
Peanuts
Festivals established in 1938